Imogene Powers Johnson (September 3, 1930 – March 3, 2018) was an American billionaire, the widow of Samuel Curtis Johnson Jr., who was CEO of S. C. Johnson & Son of Racine, Wisconsin.

According to Forbes, at the time of her death on March 3, 2018, at the age of 87, she was worth $3.7 billion.

References

1930 births
2018 deaths
American billionaires
Female billionaires
Businesspeople from Racine, Wisconsin
Samuel Curtis Johnson family